Léopold Héder (born August 16, 1918, in Cayenne, French Guiana, and died June 9, 1978, in Cambo-les-Bains, France) was a socialist politician from French Guiana who served in the French National Assembly from 1962 to 1967 and in the French Senate from 1971 to 1978. He presented himself as successor to Justin Catayée.

References 

Léopold Héder page on the French National Assembly website
Léopold Héder page on the French Senate website

1918 births
1978 deaths
People from Cayenne
French Guianan politicians
French Section of the Workers' International politicians
Socialist Party (France) politicians
Deputies of the 1st National Assembly of the French Fifth Republic
Deputies of the 2nd National Assembly of the French Fifth Republic
French Senators of the Fifth Republic
Senators of French Guiana
Presidents of the General Council of French Guiana
Mayors of Cayenne
French Guianan socialists